The 2002 Asian Games, officially known as the XIV Asian Games and also known as Busan 2002, were an international multi-sport event held in Busan, South Korea from September 29 to October 14, 2002, with the football event commenced 2 days before the opening ceremony.

Busan is the second city in South Korea, after Seoul in 1986 to host the Games. This was the second time South Korea hosted the event. A total of 419 events in 38 sports were contested by 7,711 athletes from 44 countries. The Games were also co-hosted by its four neighbouring cities: Ulsan, Changwon, Masan and Yangsan. It was opened by President of South Korea, Kim Dae-jung, at the Busan Asiad Main Stadium.

The final medal tally was led by China, followed by host South Korea and Japan. South Korea set a new record with 95 gold medals. 22 world records, 43 Asian records were broken during the Games. In addition, Japanese Swimming Kosuke Kitajima was announced as the most valuable player (MVP) of the Games.

Bidding process
Busan was selected over Kaohsiung at the 14th Olympic Council of Asia (OCA) General Assembly in Seoul, South Korea on 23 May 1995. The voting involved 41 members of the sports governing body, with 37 of them supported Busan.

Development and preparations

Costs
A total of US$2.9 billion was spent for the games.

Marketing

Emblem
The emblem of the Games is a motif of East sea blue waves in the shape of Taegeuk, symbolising Busan and Korea. It expresses the image of development and unity of the Asian people and the two dynamic powers that are closely intertwined. The wave's shape in the emblem indicates the character B, the first character of Busan.

Mascot
The mascot of the 2002 Asian Games is a Sea gull, the city bird of Busan named "Duria", whose name is a combination of the two words 'Durative' and 'Asia', which means "You and Me Together" or Everlasting Asia in the Korean language, which expresses the ideal of the Games: to promote harmony, friendship and prosperity among Asian countries. Its thick black ink and free line expression, symbolize Korean traditional culture, while its white colour shade representing the image of a powerful spirit and the great hopes for Asia in the 21st century.

Medals
The medal of the games featured the Korean traditional octagonal building, Palgagjeong top view design with the old Olympic Council of Asia logo on the obverse and Busan Asia Games Flame, logo, and Oryukdo scenery on the reverse. The design represents solidarity of membership and eternity of OCA, Busan as host of the games and youth, unity, and friendship of the athletes.

Music
In conjunction with the Games, eight songs were released as the official music for the Games:
"The Dream of Asia" – Lee Moon-se
"Frontier!-Voices from the East" – Yang Bang-ean & Furee
"We are..." – Baby box
"Theme from Duria" – Hong Jong-myung, Shin Hyo-bum
"The Fanfare" – Busan city Orchestra
"Welcome to Busan Korea" – Kim Hyo-soo
"Let's Go!!" – Gang Hyun-soo
"Love to All of Us" – CAN

Torch relay
The relay itself started at 11 a.m. on 5 September 2002 when two flames were simultaneously lit at Hallasan in South Korea and Paektu Mountain, the Korean peninsula’s highest mountain, in North Korea. 42 local flames in other participating nations were also lit at the same time. The two Korean flames were unified into one at Imjingak Pavilion at the truce village of Panmunjeom during 7 September  2002 morning and was dubbed the Unification flame. After that, a nationwide torch relay totaled a distance of 4,294 kilometres in 23 days was held. The relay passed through 904 districts in 16 cities within the country. The Unification flame joined with the flames of 42 other participating nations are also unified at the main cauldron base during the opening ceremony on 29 September 2002. The torch design was based on a Korean traditional music instrument called Taepyeongso.

Venues
42 competition venues were used in the Games with twelve of them are newly built, including the Asiad Sports Complex which was completed on 31 July 2000. Other venues included an athletes' village and a main press centre.

Asiad Sports Complex

Gangseo Sports Park

Geumjeong Sports Park

Gudeok Sports Complex

Isolated Venues

Changwon Sports Park

Masan Sports Complex

Ulsan

The Asian Village in Property Development Area, Banyeodong, Haeundae District, Busan had 2,290 apartments in 20 buildings which can accommodate 14,000 people.

Transport
The host city Busan had existing subway and bus services prior to the games.

The games

Opening ceremony
The opening ceremony with the theme “A Beautiful meeting,” was held on 29 September 2002 at the Busan Asiad Main Stadium. Participating nations marched into the stadium in Korean alphabetical order began with Nepal. North Korea and South Korea jointly entered the stadium under one flag for the first time in Asian Games history and the second time after the 2000 Summer Olympics. South Korean president Kim Dae-Jung declared the Games open, Two Korean athletes - Mun Dae-Sung (taekwondo) and Ryu Ji -Hye (table tennis) took the oath on behalf of all the participating athletes while South Korea's retired judoist Ha Hyung-joo and North Korean female judoist Kye Sun-hui lit the games' cauldron. The cultural part was 6 segment show with a total duration of 40-minutes and the was  about the enconter between King Kim Suro and the Queen Hur Hwangok was also presented, the main star of the event was the opera diva Sumi Jo.

Participating National Olympic Committees
All 44 members of Olympic Council of Asia (OCA) with 7,711 athletes took part in the Games. East Timor participated for the first time since its independence and Afghanistan returned to the action since Taliban had come to power. Below is a list of all the participating NOCs; the number of competitors per delegation is indicated in brackets.

Sports
A total of 419 events in 38 sports was contested in the Games for 16 days of competition. Football and basketball was kickoff two and one day respectively prior to the opening ceremony. Bodybuilding was the debutant sport in Games.

Aquatics
Artistic swimming
Diving
Swimming
Water polo
Archery
Athletics
Badminton
Baseball
Basketball
Cue sports
Bodybuilding
Bowling
Boxing
Canoeing
Cycling
Mountain bike
Road
Track
Equestrian
Fencing
Field hockey
Football
Golf
Gymnastics
Artistic gymnastics
Rhythmic gymnastics
Handball
Judo
Kabaddi
Karate
Modern pentathlon
Rowing
Rugby union
Union
Sevens
Sailing
Sepaktakraw
Shooting
Softball
Soft tennis
Squash
Table tennis
Taekwondo
Tennis
Volleyball
Beach volleyball
Volleyball
Weightlifting
Wrestling
Wushu

Calendar 
All times are in Korea Standard Time (UTC+9)

Closing ceremony
The closing ceremony with the theme “Returning Home.” was held on the evening of Monday, 14 October 2002 at the Busan Asiad Main Stadium. Japanese swimmer Kosuke Kitajima was announced as the most valuable player (MVP) of the Games. Samih Moudallal, vice president of the Olympic Council of Asia (OCA), on behalf of OCA President Sheikh Ahmad Al-Fahad Al Sabah declared the games closing. The Asian Games flag was handed over to Doha, Qatar, host of the next edition in 2006. A cultural segment of the city was also presented.

Medal table

The top ten ranked NOCs at these Games are listed below. The host nation, South Korea, is highlighted.

Broadcasting
Busan Asian Games Radio and Television Organization (BARTO), a joint venture between Korean Broadcasting System (KBS), Munhwa Broadcasting Corporation (MBC) and Seoul Broadcasting System (SBS), served as the host broadcaster of these Games, covered 28 of the 38 sports during the event. The International Broadcast Centre was located at Busan Exhibition and Convention Center (BEXCO) in Haeundae District.

Concerns and controversies

Doping issues
On October 7, 2002, the Olympic Council of Asia announced that the bodybuilding bronze medalist in the +90 kg weight category Youssef El-Zein of Lebanon was relieved of his medal for not submitting to a drugs test. After El-Zein was disqualified, the bronze medal in the +90 kg category went to Choi Jae-Duck of South Korea (who had finished fourth).

Six days later, Japanese news agency Kyodo News reported that Indian middle-distance runner Sunita Rani had tested positive for a banned substance, which was later confirmed by Lee Choon-Sup, Deputy Secretary General of the Busan Asian Games Organizing Committee; an unofficial report stated that the substance was the anabolic steroid nandrolone. Sunita had won two medals in athletics: a gold in the 1,500 m (setting an Asian Games record) and a bronze in the 5,000 m, (in which Sunita jointly bettered the Games record set by Indonesian Suprianti Sutono in Bangkok during the 1998 Asian Games with six other athletes). The Indian Chef de Mission at the Games backed Sunita—who denied using any banned drug—and asked for a "B" sample test from Bangkok, but tests were run only at the Asian Games’ Doping Control Center (AGDCC) in Seoul (the laboratory accredited by the IOC). On October 16, the AGDCC confirmed the steroid nandrolone in Sunita's urine sample; as a consequence, the OCA stripped her of both medals and dismissed her Asian Games record for the 1,500 m.

The Indian Olympic Association (IOA) requested the intervention of the International Association of Athletics Federations and the IOC; the samples were jointly reexamined by the World Anti-Doping Agency and the IOC Sub-Commission on Doping and Biochemistry of Sport. In January 2003, the OCA announced that the IOC Medical Director had cleared Sunita of the doping charge and that appropriate action would be taken against the AGDCC. Both of Sunita's medals were reinstated on February 4, 2003, in a ceremony attended by the Secretary General of OCA Randhir Singh and the president of the IOA Suresh Kalmadi.

Three Malaysian sepak takraw players were sent home for failing drug tests after testing positive for morphine.

Missing athletes
A total of 16 athletes including 12 Nepalese, three Sri Lankans and one Mongolian were reported to be missing, which police and sports officials suspected them to have found illegal jobs in South Korea.

See also

 1986 Asian Games
 2002 FESPIC Games
List of IOC country codes

References

External links
 2002 Asian Games official website
 Rediff games coverage site
 Getty Image

 
Asian Games
Asian Games
A
Sports competitions in Busan
Multi-sport events in South Korea
Asian Games by year
Asian Games
September 2002 sports events in Asia
October 2002 sports events in Asia